Tapash Roy (born 6 October 1941) is an Indian former cricketer. He played eight first-class matches for Bengal between 1962 and 1967.

See also
 List of Bengal cricketers

References

External links
 

1941 births
Living people
Indian cricketers
Bengal cricketers
People from Mymensingh District